Melesio Piña Oregel (born 12 February 1948) is a Mexican sprinter. He competed in the men's 400 metres at the 1968 Summer Olympics.

References

1948 births
Living people
Athletes (track and field) at the 1968 Summer Olympics
Athletes (track and field) at the 1971 Pan American Games
Mexican male sprinters
Olympic athletes of Mexico
Sportspeople from Tepic, Nayarit
Central American and Caribbean Games medalists in athletics
Pan American Games competitors for Mexico
20th-century Mexican people